Cottown may refer to:

Cottown, Aberdeenshire, Scotland
Cottown, Perth and Kinross, Scotland